Alambari River may refer to:

Alambari River (Tietê River)
Alambari River (Turvo River)